Dongluobao Township is a township of Dingxing County, in central Hebei province, China. , it has 16 villages under its administration:
Dongluobao Village
Nanyin Village
Dongyin Village
Dongceshang Village
Xiceshang Village
Dongxianggai Village
Xixianggai Village
Chenjiazhuang Village
Datian Village
Wuliyao Village
Tianhou Village
Wu Village
Beidawei Village
Nandawei Village
Xiaoren Village
Daren Village

See also
List of township-level divisions of Hebei

References

Township-level divisions of Hebei
Dingxing County